Abubaker "the Slim" (Qecchin) also known simply as Qecchin or Katchthcen was a general in the Adal Sultanate under Ahmad ibn Ibrahim al-Ghazi. Abubaker's sobriquet "Qecchin" is derived from the Harari term for "thin". He was the Garad/emir of Hubat.

He often accompanied the Malassay during the Ethiopian-Adal War. Qecchin was a victim to the early Abyssinian invasion of Adal in which his mother was briefly captured at the Battle of Hubat. Qecchin led the conquest of Wofla in modern Tigray region and Kanfat in southern Begemder,  after which he was appointed governor of these respective regions by Adal.

References

People from the Adal Sultanate
Military personnel killed in action